Bhadrabas is a village and former Village Development Committee that is now part of Kageshwari-Manohara Municipality in Kathmandu District in Province No. 3 of central Nepal, located approximately  northeast of Kathmandu. At the time of the 2011 Nepal census it had a population of 2,388 and had 503 houses in it. The oldest high school in the eastern Kathmandu Valley, Adarsh  Madhayamik Vidhalaya is located in Bhadrabas. The Nepal Red Cross Society is active in Bhadrabas and it has notable health centre. In 1984, a tobacco smoking World Health Organization questionnaire was given to the inhabitants of Bhadrabas to survey smoking trends in the country.

Vertebrate fossil remains have been found northeast of the village.

References

Populated places in Kathmandu District